The USS Hornet Museum is a museum ship, located on the southernmost pier of the former Naval Air Station Alameda in Alameda, California, US.

The museum is composed of the aircraft carrier , exhibits from the NASA Apollo Moon exploration missions, and several retired aircraft from the Second World War and the transonic and early supersonic jet propulsion period. A number of compartments contain exhibits concerning contemporary carriers that are supported by related associations. The flight deck, hangar deck, and first deck below are open for self-guided tours. Docent-led tours are available into the ship's navigation and flight deck control areas of the island and down into one of the engineering spaces containing two of the four ship's propulsion turbines.

Opening ceremony
The USS Hornet Museum officially opened to the public on October 17, 1998. Apollo 11 astronaut Buzz Aldrin was the principal speaker. Attending dignitaries included Congresswoman Barbara Lee; Honorable Jerry Brown – Mayor-elect of Oakland; Honorable Ralph Appezzatto – Mayor of Alameda; General Richard Hearney – Vice President for Domestic Business Development, Boeing Company; and Rear Admiral Robert Chaplin – Superintendent, Naval Postgraduate School, Monterey, California.

Aircraft on display
The USS Hornet Museum has a number of aircraft on display including propeller aircraft, jet aircraft, and rotorcraft. The aircraft are from the 1940s, 1950s, 1960s, 1970s, and 1980s. Museum guests can get up-close to the aircraft displayed on the flight deck and on the hangar deck. Aircraft are sometimes moved between decks utilizing the ship's #1 aircraft elevator. Exhibit highlights include:
 TBM-3E Avenger – torpedo bomber from World War II
 T-28B Trojan – military trainer
 US-2B Tracker – anti-submarine warfare (ASW) utility aircraft
 FJ-2 Fury – 1950s swept-wing fighter jet
 TA-4J Skyhawk – trainer from the last aggressor squadron, VC-8
 F8U-1 Crusader – Vietnam War era supersonic fighter
 S-3B Viking – all-weather, multi-mission, long-range aircraft
 F-14A Tomcat – veteran of the Gulf War
 HUP-1 Retriever - ship based utility helicopter for search and rescue
 SH-2 Seasprite -  Mid-1950s shipboard utility helicopter
 SH-3H Sea King - All weather helicopter designed for anti-submarine warfare
 UH-34D Seahorse - Vietnam era personnel transport and combat assault helicopter
 FM-2 Wildcat - WW2 fighter

Apollo splashdown display
USS Hornet was selected in 1969 to serve as the Prime Recovery Ship (PRS) for the Apollo 11 Moon mission. Hornet led the recovery of the first astronauts to land on the Moon following their splashdown back on Earth. Four months later, Hornet recovered the all-Navy crew of Apollo 12. The USS Hornet Museum has the largest Apollo Program exhibit on the West Coast of the United States. Artifacts on display include:
 Apollo Command Module CSM-011 used for the AS-202 uncrewed suborbital flight test
 Mobile Quarantine Facility (MQF) used by the Apollo 14 astronauts following their return to Earth
 SH-3H Sea King used in the 1995 movie Apollo 13
 Memorabilia and photos from the Apollo 11 and 12 splashdowns

Tours
The tour of the ship is mostly self-guided. A tour map is available at the admissions desk and museum docents are available throughout the ship to answer questions and lead special tours. A short video on the history of the ship is shown in the orientation area.

Overnight programs
The USS Hornet Museum offers a Live-Aboard Program that is available to any organized youth group or family. Guests can experience the life of a sailor by touring the ship at night, eating in the crew's mess, and sleeping in the berthing compartments (bunks).

Gallery

See also
 U.S. Navy museums (and other aircraft-carrier museums)
 List of aircraft carriers of the United States Navy
 List of maritime museums in the United States
 Pacific Reserve Fleet, Alameda

References

External links
 Official page USS Hornet Museum and Aircraft Carrier Hornet Foundation

Hornet
National Historic Landmarks in the San Francisco Bay Area
California Historical Landmarks
Military and war museums in California
Museums in Alameda County, California
Aerospace museums in California
Hornet
Tourist attractions in Alameda County, California
National Register of Historic Places in Alameda County, California
1998 establishments in California
Museums established in 1998